Kalati is a village in the municipality of Bihać, Bosnia and Herzegovina.

Demographics 
According to the 2013 census, its population was one, down from 52 in 1991.

See also 
 Kulen Vakuf massacre

References

Populated places in Bihać